شهرک عباس آباد

Abbasabad-e Fakhrai (also Romanized as ‘Abbāsābād-e Fakhrā”ī; also known as ‘Abbāsābād) is a village in Qeblehi Rural District, in the Central District of Dezful County, Khuzestan Province, Iran. At the 2006 census, its population was 403, in 89 families.

References 

Populated places in Dezful County